The voiced palatal click is a click consonant found among the languages of southern Africa.

Features

Features of the voiced palatal click:

Occurrence
Voiced palatal clicks are only found in the various Khoisan language families of southern Africa and in the neighboring Yeyi language.

References

Click consonants
Palatal consonants
Central consonants
Voiced oral consonants